Epistinia Fyodorovna Stepanova (November 18, 1882 —  February 7, 1969) was a Russian woman whose eight sons died in the war, the ninth son died from wounds received at the front. Cavalier of the orders Mother Heroine and the Order of the Patriotic War, I degree.

Biography
Epistinia Stepanova was born on November 18, 1882, on the territory of present-day Ukraine, but from childhood she lived in the Kuban. The Stepanovs lived on the May Day farm (now the Olkhovsky farm) in the Timashyovsky District of the Krasnodar Krai. She gave birth to fifteen children. 

Son of Alexander St. (1901–1918) captured in the field, tortured and shot by whites in retaliation for the help provided by the Stepanov family to the Red Army. Sons Vasily,  Philipp, Fyodor, Alexander Jr. (posthumously the Hero of the Soviet Union), Ivan, Ilya and Pavel died during the Second World War from 1939 to 1943. Son Nikolai in August 1945 returned from the hospital, was ill for a long time, died of wounds.

In recent years, Epistinia lived in Rostov-on-Don, in the family of her only daughter, Valentina Korzhova. She died there on February 7, 1969. The soldier's mother was buried in the village  Dneprovskaya,   Krasnodar Krai, with full military honors.

References

External links 
 Епистиния Степанова: история материнского подвига

1882 births
1969 deaths
Russian women in World War II
Soviet women in World War II
Russian people of Ukrainian descent